Rowshan Ara Mannan (born 3 January 1948) is a Bangladesh Jatiya Party politician in Bangladesh and reserved women seats of 47-Elected MP. Rowshan Ara Mannan for being elected as a lawmaker reserved for women in the 11 parliament.

Early life 
Rowshan Ara Mannan was born in a Muslim family of Kotoali, Comilla district. She has a  M.A, B.Ed. degree.

Politics career 
Rowshan Ara Mannan was elected MP from reserved seats for Comilla District, in the nomination of Jatiya Party for the continuation of the Jatiya Sangsad elections.

References

Living people
10th Jatiya Sangsad members
11th Jatiya Sangsad members
People from Comilla District
1948 births
Jatiya Party politicians
Women members of the Jatiya Sangsad
20th-century Bangladeshi women politicians
21st-century Bangladeshi women politicians